Wathlingen is a Samtgemeinde ("collective municipality") in the district of Celle, in Lower Saxony, Germany. Its seat is in Wathlingen.

The Samtgemeinde Wathlingen consists of the following municipalities:

 Adelheidsdorf 
 Nienhagen 
 Wathlingen

Samtgemeinden in Lower Saxony
Celle (district)